Bruno Pascua (born 21 January 1990) is a Spanish football player who currently plays for Bolivian club Guabirá.

Club statistics

Updated to games played as of 2 December 2014.

References

External links
MLSZ

1990 births
Living people
People from Santander, Spain
Spanish footballers
Spanish expatriate footballers
Association football midfielders
Rayo Cantabria players
Dunaújváros PASE players
Universitario de Sucre footballers
Grindavík men's football players
Nacional Potosí players
Guabirá players
Tercera División players
Segunda División B players
Nemzeti Bajnokság I players
Bolivian Primera División players
Expatriate footballers in Hungary
Expatriate footballers in Bolivia
Expatriate footballers in Iceland
Spanish expatriate sportspeople in Hungary
Spanish expatriate sportspeople in Bolivia
Spanish expatriate sportspeople in Iceland